Galerie St. Petri is a Conceptual art gallery situated in Lund, Sweden.  It was opened by Jean Sellem, a French artist who immigrated to Sweden in the 1970s and is a professor of Art history at Lund University.

In the 1970s the gallery called: "Galerie S:t Petri - Archive of Experimental and Marginal Art" quickly became an international Conceptual art and Performance art space,  closely collaborating with Fluxus artists.

Bibliography

 Jean Sellem, (ed.): Fluxus Research, Lund Art Press, Vol. 2, No. 2, 1991
 Jean Sellem,  Hardy Strid's Work and Swedish modernism in art from 1935 to 1980.
 The Fluxus reader By Ken Friedman, page Page 171
 Encyclopedia of aesthetics By Michael Kelly, Oxford University Press, 1998 v. 4, Page 294

Art museums and galleries in Sweden
Museums in Skåne County
20th-century establishments in Skåne County